MJur (Magister Juris or Master of Jurisprudence; common abbreviations include MJur, M.Jur., Mag. Jur. and Mag. iur.) is an academic degree in law awarded by some universities.

Magister Juris at the University of Oxford
The Magister Juris (MJur) is a one-year master's level course offered at the Faculty of Law, University of Oxford. It is a postgraduate degree requiring a previous first-class undergraduate degree with honours in law for admission, and is comparable to an LL.M. It is a counterpart to the long-established Bachelor of Civil Law (BCL) offered at Oxford - which the University immodestly claims to be "the most highly regarded taught masters-level qualification in the common law world" - but for students from a civil law rather than a common law background.

The content and structure of the MJur is practically the same as the BCL, and for the most part, BCL and MJur students study the same options in the same classes. Students select four options from a list of 40 or so available in common to BCL and MJur students. In place of one of the four taught options, students may also choose to write a dissertation of 10,000 to 12,500 words. Alternatively, MJur students only may select one option from a list of approximately 12 courses from the undergraduate BA in Jurisprudence.  All taught options are taught by a combination of lectures and/or seminars and tutorials. Tutorials, which involve an intensive discussion between a tutor and two or three students, are a feature of the MJur and BCL programmes which is not offered in any taught graduate course in law elsewhere in the world.

Academic dress for the MJur is the same as for the BCL, an outward sign of their shared content and structure: A black gown of silk with a form of black lace sewn on the collar, the lower part of the back, and down the sleeves which are closed and cut straight, but have an opening just above the elbow. The hood, of Dean Burgon shape, is of blue corded silk or poplin with white fur fabric. Holders of the MJur degree rank directly below Bachelors of Civil Law, and above Bachelors of Medicine and Surgery.

Admission to the MJur is slightly more competitive than to the BCL: According to data disclosed by the University of Oxford, for 50 places available each year, 376 people applied on average in the three years before the academic year 2019/20, which equals an average application success rate of 13.2%. The success rate for BCL applications in the same period was 15.1%.

Historically, students from civil law jurisdictions were able to study for the BCL at Oxford, but had to meet additional requirements. Following the establishment of the Institute for European and Comparative Law at Oxford, in 1992 the faculty of law introduced a one-year degree programme of Magister Juris in European and Comparative Law, and in 1999/2000 closed the BCL to students from civil law jurisdictions. The Magister Juris at that time allowed to choose a number of undergraduate options, as well as an option in the history faculty. As the MJur and BCL programmes became more similar, the qualifier in European and Comparative Law was dropped in 2001.

Master of Jurisprudence at the universities of Durham and Birmingham 

Whereas the Oxford MJur is a taught degree, the MJur programmes offered by Durham and Birmingham are research degrees. It is awarded on the basis of a candidate's thesis (usually 40,000 words) in an approved area of law, under the supervision of an academic staff. The MJur must demonstrate an advanced understanding of the subject but – in contrast to a PhD – need not constitute an original contribution to knowledge nor reach a standard worthy of publication. Unlike LLM or Oxford's MJur dissertations, MJur degrees at Durham and Birmingham are examined by appointed internal and external examiners, for which a report is prepared. A viva voce, an essential component of PhDs at British universities, is unusual for MJur degrees.

Ireland 
University College Dublin offers the Masters in Common Law (MCL/ Magisterii in Jure Communi, M.Jur.Com), an advanced two-year programme for non-law graduates. The degree is a qualifying law degree for admittance to the entrance exams of the Honorable Society of King's Inns.

Germany 

Historically, German law students did not receive any academic degree upon completion of their curriculum. Instead, after usually four or five years of study, students sit their First State Examination (Erstes Staatsexamen) in Law, which is administered by the ministry of justice of the respective state, not the university. More recently, however, some universities have begun to award their students a Magister Juris upon passing the First State Examination, in order to indicate the equivalence of the education to a master's degree in other disciplines. Examples include the universities of Cologne,  Constance and Heidelberg. Other German universities are awarding a Diplom-Jurist degree to their law examinees, following the same principle.

Austria 

Austrian law students are usually awarded a "Mag. iur." after completion of a four-year curriculum. On average it takes students 13.6 semesters to complete the curriculum. Despite the Bologna process Law is one of the studies that still stick to the traditional Austrian system without a bachelor's and master's degree.  However, in addition to traditional law studies, there are also special study programmes such as business law, which could be completed with academic degrees like LL.B. (bachelor's degree) or further with a LL.M. (master's degree).

Italy 
After the Bologna process, the former Laurea in Giurisprudenza had been replaced by a first level degree, Laurea in Scienze Giuridiche (three years), and a second level degree, Laurea Specialistica in Giurisprudenza (two further years). This system changed in 2006: at present the Laurea Magistrale in Giurisprudenza (i.e., Magister Juris) is the law degree in Italy. It is a five-year, second level (master's) degree which does not require a previous bachelor's degree for the admission (Laurea Magistrale a ciclo unico, i.e. integrated master's degree).

See also 
Master of Laws
Master of Studies in Law
Master of Jurisprudence

References 

Law degrees
Master's degrees